Rosalyn Richter  is an American lawyer who served as an associate justice of the New York Appellate Division of the Supreme Court, First Judicial Department.

Early life and education
Richter is the daughter of Anita Richter and the late Nathaniel Richter. She is a 1976 graduate of Barnard College and a 1979 graduate of Brooklyn Law School.

Legal career
Richter enjoyed a lengthy career in the judiciary. She began serving on the New York City Criminal Court from 1990 to 1996. Richter then proceeded to serve as a New York Supreme Court Justice, from 2002 to 2009. She was designated a Justice for the Appellate Division, First Judicial Department in 2008 by Governor David Paterson.

On August 3, 2018, Richter received the Dan Bradley Award, the National LGBT Bar Association’s highest honor, in recognition of her pathbreaking legacy of service. As Richter, put it, she was honored for "being so out in the late 1970s, and 1980s and for being out throughout [her] judicial career."

Justice Richter ended her lengthy judicial career by retiring in July 2020.

Personal life
Richter married her wife, Janet Weinberg, in August 2011, shortly after same-sex marriage was legalized in the state of New York. Weinberg died on September 1, 2018 in the Bronx.

See also 
 List of LGBT jurists in the United States

References

Living people
New York (state) lawyers
Barnard College alumni
Brooklyn Law School alumni
LGBT people from New York (state)
Year of birth missing (living people)
LGBT judges
Arnold & Porter people